

Dinosaurs

Pterosaurs

New taxa

References

1860s in paleontology
Paleontology, 1861 In
Paleontology, 1861 in